Geography Club is a 2013 American comedy-drama film directed by Gary Entin from a screenplay by Edmund Entin, based on the 2003 novel of the same name by Brent Hartinger. The film stars Cameron Deane Stewart, Justin Deeley, Meaghan Martin, Allie Gonino, Nikki Blonsky, Andrew Caldwell, Marin Hinkle, Ana Gasteyer, and Scott Bakula.

It premiered on ABC Family as a world premiere movie.

Plot
Russell is sixteen-years-old and is going on dates with girls. But he’s recently started falling for football quarterback Kevin. When Min stumbles across Russell and Kevin kissing for the first time during a school trip, she decides to invite Russell to an LGBT support group in the school. This group meets in a classroom regularly and masquerades as a Geography Club. The club consists of a small number of students including Min and Therese who tell everyone that they are just really good friends when in reality this is not the case. There is also Ike who can’t quite figure out who he really is.

Russell gets invited to a meal at Kevin’s parents house after a great football match. The meal is awkward due to the fathers questioning and the guys feelings for each other. Meanwhile, Russell’s best mate Gunnar gets Kevin to go on a trip with some girls. He’s upset that they aren’t as close as they were and knows he’s acting weird. Whilst they are hanging out, the girls try to come on to Russell. He leaves and walks home by himself messaging Kevin asking for a lift home, confiding in his worries.

As the weeks go by the Geography Club members grow closer supporting one another. The group chastises Russell when he bullies one of the other club members due to peer pressure from classmates. Rumours have spread that Russell is a “homo” and he’s been kicked off the football team. Min suggests that the club finally go public which means they will all be outed. Kevin meets Russell to apologies for him being kicked off the team. Russell tells Kevin he should join the Geography Club but Kevin freaks out saying he can’t. He wants to stay in the closet, play football and be ‘normal’. Russell gives Kevin an ultimatum. Either turn up tomorrow at the club or they should go their separate ways.

Gunnar and Kevin make amends and the club go public welcoming new people. Kevin watches on from a distance not feeling able to attend. Russell stands up and welcomes students to the first ever Gay Straight Alliance (GSA) meeting.

Cast
 Cameron Deane Stewart as Russell Middlebrook
 Justin Deeley as Kevin Land
 Andrew Caldwell as Gunnar
 Meaghan Martin as Trish
 Allie Gonino as Kimberly
 Ally Maki as Min
 Nikki Blonsky as Therese
 Alex Newell as Ike
 Teo Olivares as Brian Bund
 Dexter Darden as Jared Sharp
 Grant Harvey as Nolan Lockwood
 Marin Hinkle as Barbara Land
 Ana Gasteyer as Mrs. Toles
 Scott Bakula as Carl Land
 Wesley Eure as Mr. Kaplan
 Mike Muscat as a Deranged Homeless Man

Release
Geography Club premiered at the Newport Beach Film Festival on April 27, 2013. The film received a limited theatrical release by Breaking Glass Pictures on November 15, 2013 and was also released digitally the same day on iTunes, Amazon Video and VOD.

Reception

On Rotten Tomatoes the film holds a 67% rating based on 12 reviews, with an average rating of 6/10. On Metacritic, the film has a weighted average score of 57 based on reviews from 5 critics, indicating "mixed or average reviews".

Writing for The Huffington Post, John Lopez describes the film as entertaining and praises the themes as "universal and relatable", as well as for trying to define a "new normal" where homosexuality is accepted as an everyday thing.

Entertainment Tonight hails Geography Club saying, "Every year sees the release of one film so culturally important it should be required viewing. This year, that film is Geography Club."  
The Movie and Television Review and Classification Board (MTRCB) of the Philippine government gave the movie a PG rating and highly commends the film as a "sweet and sensitive coming out, coming of age movie based on the first novel of the young adult series/play of the same name."

Awards
Following is a list of awards that Geography Club or its cast have won or for which they have been nominated.

Won
 L.A. Outfest
 Audience Award – Best Feature Film
Nominated
 L.A. Outfest
 Best Performance by an Actress in a Leading Role – Meaghan Martin
Glaad
 Outstanding Film – Limited Release

Home media
Breaking Glass Pictures released Geography Club on DVD on March 25, 2014.

References

External links
 
 

2013 films
2013 comedy-drama films
2013 independent films
2013 LGBT-related films
2010s coming-of-age comedy-drama films
2010s high school films
2010s teen comedy-drama films
American coming-of-age comedy-drama films
American independent films
American teen comedy-drama films
American teen LGBT-related films
Films based on American novels
Films based on young adult literature
Films shot in Los Angeles
Gay-related films
LGBT-related comedy-drama films
LGBT-related coming-of-age films
Shoreline Entertainment films
2010s English-language films
2010s American films